Mage Gauntlet is an iOS action-adventure game developed by American studio Rocketcat Games and released on October 20, 2011. The player controls Lexi in search of a way to defeat the demon Lord Hurgoroth, and prevent him from taking over the world.

Gameplay
Mage Gauntlet is a 2D game with live-action type of game mechanics and pixel graphics.

Reception

The game has a Metacritic score of 84/100 based on 15 critic reviews.

References

2011 video games
GameClub games
IOS games
IOS-only games
Rocketcat Games games
Role-playing video games
Single-player video games
Video games developed in the United States